Mikio Yahara (born April 4, 1947 in Ehime Prefecture) is a Japanese karate expert of the Shotokan style. He holds the rank of 10th dan.

Biography
Yahara was born in 1947 in Ehime Prefecture, the fourth son of a prominent family with ancient samurai roots. He started his martial art training in judo. After studying at Kokushikan University, he became a kenshusei (or junior instructor) with the Japan Karate Association and began his career as a competitive karateka. In the period 1974-1984, he achieved substantial success both in kumite and kata.

In 2000, after a battle for leadership at the JKA, which lasted from 1987 to 1999, Yahara decided to establish his own organization, the Karatenomichi World Federation that promotes Yahara's core concept of "one killing blow".

Tournament achievements

JKA All-Japan Championships
1984 - 3rd (kumite), 1st (kata), Grand Champion
1983 - 2nd (kata)
1982 - 3rd (kumite), 2nd (kata)
1981 - 2nd (kata)
1980 - 2nd (kata)
1979 - 3rd (kumite)
1978 - 2nd (kumite), 2nd (kata)
1976 - 3rd (kumite)
1975 - 2nd (kumite)
1974 - 1st (team kumite)

JKA/IAKF World Championships
1983 (Egypt) - 1st (team kumite), 1st (team kata), 2nd (kata)
1980 (Germany) - 1st (team kumite), 1st (team kata), 2nd (kata)
1977 (Japan) - 1st (team kumite), 1st (team kata), 2nd (kata)
1975 (USA) - 1st (team kumite), 1st (team kata)

Asian Championships
1974 (Singapore) - 1st (team kumite)
1983 (Singapore) - 1st (kumite), 1st (kata)

World Cup
1984 (Hungary) - 1st (kata)

See also
List of Shotokan organizations

References

External links

1947 births
Japanese male karateka
Living people